The Arima Velodrome is an outdoor velodrome in Arima, Trinidad and Tobago. The velodrome is an open outdoor velodrome serving the Borough of Arima and its suburbs. It hosts grass and concrete surface. From 2017 it was to become the home stadium for TT Pro League club North East Stars.

References

External links

Velodromes
Sports venues in Trinidad and Tobago
Cycle racing in Trinidad and Tobago
North East Stars F.C.